Isa Hayatu Chiroma (13 April 1963) is Nigeria legal practitioner and professor of law at the University of Maiduguri. In February 2018, he is appointed as the Director General of the Nigeria Law School by Muhammadu Buhari. He replaced Professor Olanrewaju Onadeko who served for eight year. Prior to be appointed, he was the deputy director in the Yola campus of Nigeria Law School from 2011 to 2016.

He became a Senior Advocate of Nigeria, ranked at the 133 plenary session meetings in 2018.

Background 
Isa Hayatu was born in Mubi of Mubi North Local Government, Adamawa State. He began his early school in 1970 at Mubi Primary School to 1976 and moved to Government Technical School Mubi in 1976 to 1981. He obtained his bachelor's of law degree in 1986 and masters of law in 1991 from the University of Maiduguri, and holds a PhD of law in 2005 at the University of Jos.

Career

He started as an assistant lecturer in the faculty of law at the University of Maiduguri in 1988 teaching administrative, constitutional, Islamic, policy and humanitarian, environmental law and Islamic jurisprudence courses the same year he was called to Bar and became professor of law in 2005. He served as head of department in Public, Shari’ah law, Dean of Law and director in Consultancy Services Centre in the University of Maiduguri. He founded and coordinate the Clinical Legal Education Programme and rose to become a member in the University Senate, he is a Member in Legal Practitioners, Privileges Committee for Selection of Senior Advocate of Nigeria in Academics and member Governing Council of Federal Polytechnic Mubi, Adamawa State.

His areas of specialization was Environmental Law and Policy, Humanitarian Law, Human Rights, Access to Justice, Law and Development and Ethics in the teaching and practice of Law.

Chiroma had supervised many research based on his area of interest and is a member African Law Association of Germany, Global Alliance for Justice Education, International Bar Association, Nigerian Institute of Mediators and Conciliators, Nigerian Bar Association, Society for Corporate Governance and Fellow of the Chartered Institute of Arbitrators, and is a Notary Public person.

References 

1963 births
University of Maiduguri alumni
University of Jos alumni
Nigerian jurists
Nigerian educators
Nigerian editors
Senior Advocates of Nigeria
Living people